Dominique Jolin was born in Chibougamau, Quebec, Canada in 1964. She is the French Canadian author of Toopy and Binoo, a popular children's television show. Toopy is a large size mouse who shares his creative imagination with his small silent cat friend, Binoo. Jolin's original books were written in French and titled Toupie et Binou.

The Toupie et Binou books were originally published in English as Washington and Deecee, although the names Toopy and Binoo were retained for the television adaptation. A book published in 2001 titled Little Red Washington was also published using the same cover image with brighter colors and titled Little Red Toopy in 2007.  Both books are published by Dominique & Friends.

Awards
1992 Mr. Christie's Book Award (for illustrations) for C'est pas juste!
1993- Livromagie prize (children's favourite book) for Au cinéma avec Papa 
1995- Livromagie prize (children's favourite book) for Qu'est-ce que vous faites là?  
1996- Livromagie prize (children's favourite book) for Un prof extra  
1997- Livromagie prize (favourite children's book) for Cruelle Cruellina  
1997- Finalist for the Mr. Christie Award for Roméo le rat romantique  
1998- Finalist for the M. Christie Award for Marie-Baba et les quarante rameurs  
2000- Silver Seal of the Mr Christie Award for Destructotor  
2002- GVL illustration prize for Le Petit Toupie Rouge  
2006- Boomerang Award (Toupie et Binou website)  
2007- Award of Excellence for Toupie et Binou in the New Canadian Media category  
2007- Finalist at the Gemini Awards for Toupie et Binou, category: Preschool animated series  
2016- Gémeaux nomination for Toupie et Binou (best television series)  
2019- Gemini Award nomination for YaYa et Zouk (Best Animated Series or Program)

References

External link 
Official website of Dominique Jolin

Canadian television writers
Living people
People from Chibougamau
Writers from Quebec
Canadian children's writers in French
Canadian women children's writers
Canadian women television writers
Year of birth missing (living people)